Curtitoma delicata is a species of sea snail, a marine gastropod mollusk in the family Mangeliidae.

Description

Distribution
This marine species occurs off Japan.

References

 Okutani, T. (1964) Report on the archibenthal and abyssal gastropod Mollusca mainly collected from Sagami Bay and adjacent waters by the R.V. Soyo-Maru during the years 1955–1963. Journal of the Faculty of Science, University of Tokyo, section II, 15 (3) : 371–447
 Hasegawa K. (2009) Upper bathyal gastropods of the Pacific coast of northern Honshu, Japan, chiefly collected by R/V Wakataka-maru. In: T. Fujita (ed.), Deep-sea fauna and pollutants off Pacific coast of northern Japan. National Museum of Nature and Science Monographs 39: 225–383

External links
  Tucker, J.K. 2004 Catalog of recent and fossil turrids (Mollusca: Gastropoda). Zootaxa 682: 1–1295.

delicata